"A Beautiful Prayer" is the best-known work of Nauruan poet Joanne Gobure.

Structure and influences

The poem shows the influence of Christian, particularly Biblical, theology, and a certain maturity of outlook, given the youth of the writer. It testifies to the writer's evident meditation on the 15th chapter of the Gospel of John, on the 8th chapter of Paul's Epistle to the Romans, and to her experience of life.

It is composed mainly of similar, recurring stanzas, principally consisting of the writer's faith dialogue and the witness to her growth in spiritual understanding, in response to her various prayer petitions.

Themes

Children with disabilities

The second stanza raises an issue commanding practical human and family interest: the challenge posed to parents by, but also the prior importance of the spiritual wholeness of, children with disabilities: 'I asked God to make my handicapped child whole'. The poet subsequently attributes to God a growing appreciation of the primacy, and possibility, of her disabled child's spirit being whole: 'His spirit is whole, his body is only temporary'.

Personhood/world paradigm

The final lines of the poem differ somewhat from the preceding stanzas, and arguably even move beyond the strict theme of prayer: 'To the world you might be one person, 
But to one person you just might be the world.' In terms of broader thematic parallels, such a play on the words 'one person' and 'world' can be compared with the notion of microcosm in universality, which also expresses something of the cultural contribution of, and human interest in, the small nation of Nauru. The personhood / world dichotomy, pithily expressed here by Gobure, is also a theme taken up in writing commanding universal interest. The Evangelist John's words are apposite: 'He came into the world, and the world was made by him, and the world knew him not.' (John 1.10)

Relevance to themes in world literature

The simplicity of this young Nauruan writer's poem thus echoes themes in world literature in a striking manner in which comparativists in the school of Lionel Trilling and others will be able to identify.

Some literary critics who see secular humanism in terms of the very nature of things would also discount the relevance of the religious imagery in this contemporary poem of Gobure. Others would recall the religious background of Nauruan society with which Gobure is identified.

References

External links
 (Text of Joanne Gobure's 'A Beautiful Prayer')

Nauruan literature
Christianity in Nauru